Letters to Milena is a book collecting some of Franz Kafka's letters to Milena Jesenská from 1920 to 1923.

Publication history
The letters were originally published in German in 1952 as Briefe an Milena, edited by Willy Haas, who decided to delete certain passages which he thought might hurt people who were still alive at the time. The collection was first published in English by Schocken Books in 1953, translated by Tania and James Stern. 
A new German edition, restoring the passages Haas had deleted, was published in 1986, followed by a new English translation by Philip Boehm in 1990. This edition includes some of Milena's letters to Max Brod, as well as four essays by her and an obituary for Kafka.

Quote
The easy possibility of writing letters must have brought wrack and ruin to the souls of the world. Writing letters is actually an intercourse with ghosts, and by no means just the ghost of the addressee but also with one's own ghost, which secretly evolves inside the letter one is writing.

References

 Kafka, Franz. Letters to Milena. Translated by Philip Boehm, New York: Schocken Books, 1990. 

1952 non-fiction books
Essays by Franz Kafka
Collections of letters
Books published posthumously
Schocken Books books